Wolfgang Seeliger (Heidelberg, May 30, 1946) is a German choral conductor. With his Konzertchor Darmstadt he won the EBU Let the Peoples Sing prize in 1991, and he himself was awarded the Goethe-Plakette des Landes Hessen in 2006.

Selected Discography
For Christophorus (record label)
 Max Bruch: Lieder für gemischten Chor, Konzertchor Darmstadt, Wolfgang Seeliger 2 CDs
 Johannes Brahms: 26 Deutsche Volkslieder, Konzertchor Darmstadt, Seeliger
 Kantaten & Lieder zur Weihnacht, Barbara Schlick, Konzertchor & Kammerorchester Darmstadt, Seeliger
 Telemann: Matthäus-Passion (1746), Maria Zedelius, Browner, Blochwitz, Scharinger, Kammerorchester Darmstadt, Seeliger
 Carl Amand Mangold: Abraham 2CDs

References

German male conductors (music)
1946 births
Living people
21st-century German conductors (music)
21st-century German male musicians